Farnborough may refer to:

Australia 
 Farnborough, Queensland, a locality in the Shire of Livingstone

United Kingdom 
 Farnborough, Hampshire, a town in the Rushmoor district of Hampshire, England
 Farnborough (Main) railway station, a railway station in the town of Farnborough, Hampshire
 Farnborough North railway station, a railway station in the town of Farnborough, Hampshire
 Farnborough, Berkshire, a small village 
 Farnborough, London, a settlement in the London Borough of Bromley
 Farnborough, Warwickshire, a village and civil parish in the English county of Warwickshire
 Farnborough Rural District, a rural district in Warwickshire, England, from 1894 to 1932

See also
 Farnborough Airport, at Farnborough, Hampshire, formerly the Royal Aircraft Establishment
 Farnborough Airshow, a seven-day international trade fair held biennially in Hampshire
 Farnborough College of Technology
 Farnborough F.C., an English football team in Farnborough, Hampshire
 Royal Aircraft Establishment, during its time at Farnborough airfield
 Saint Michael's Abbey, Farnborough, a Benedictine abbey in Farnborough, Hampshire
 Sixth Form College, Farnborough
 Farmborough, a village in Somerset, England
 Fahnbulleh, a surname pronounced similarly